Jean Prouff (12 September 1919 – 12 February 2008) was a French football midfielder and a manager.

Honours

As a player
Reims
 Division 1: 1949

As a coach
Standard de Liège
 Belgian League: 1963

Rennes
 Coupe de France: 1965, 1971

References

1919 births
2008 deaths
French footballers
France international footballers
Association football midfielders
SC Fives players
Stade Rennais F.C. players
Stade de Reims players
FC Rouen players
Stade Malherbe Caen players
French football managers
French expatriate football managers
En Avant Guingamp managers
Stade Malherbe Caen managers
US Boulogne managers
Red Star F.C. managers
Stade de Reims managers
Stade Rennais F.C. managers
Sportspeople from Morbihan
Ligue 1 managers
Standard Liège managers
Gabon national football team managers
Expatriate football managers in Gabon
Expatriate football managers in Poland
Expatriate football managers in Belgium
French expatriate sportspeople in Belgium
French expatriate sportspeople in Gabon
French expatriate sportspeople in Poland
Pays d'Aix FC players
Pays d'Aix FC managers
Footballers from Brittany